Kingston Village Historic District may refer to:

Kingston Village Historic District (Kingston, New Jersey), listed on the National Register of Historic Places in Middlesex County, New Jersey and listed in Somerset County, New Jersey
Kingston Village Historic District (Kingston, Rhode Island), listed on the National Register of Historic Places in Washington County, Rhode Island